Gaon Tasa Changla Pan Veshila Tangla ( gate) is a Indian Marathi-language film directed by Anant Mane and produced by Chelaram Bhatia with Lalchand Bhatia. The film was released on 21 October 1985.

Cast 

The cast includes Usha Naik, Ashok Saraf, Nilu Phule  & Others.

Soundtrack
The music has been directed by Ram Kadam.

Track listing
"Na Kalale Tula Na Kalale Mala" - Anjali Mahulikar, Kishore Bhagwat
"He Sukhkarta He Dukhharta" - Anuradha Marathe, Anjali Mahulikar
"Aho Tirshinge Aho Barshinge" - Anuradha Marathe, Kishore Bhagwat
"Gham Guluni Kaam Karuya" - Anjali Mahulikar, Kishore Bhagwat
"Ishkacha Madanbaan Sutala" - Anuradha Marathe
"Mangalmurti Moraya" - Ram Kadam
"San Varsacha Aala" - Anuradha Marathe, Anjali Mahulikar
"Gaon Tasa Changala Pan Veshila Tangala Theme" (Instrumental) - N/A

References

External links 
 
  Ashok Saraf Biography - marathiactors.com
 Music Album - raaga.com

1985 films
1980s Marathi-language films
Films scored by Ram Kadam